Colebrook Township may refer to the following townships in the United States:

 Colebrook Township, Ashtabula County, Ohio
 Colebrook Township, Clinton County, Pennsylvania